Into the Darkness: EP & Demos is the debut EP by Samantha Scarlette. It was released on June 28, 2012. Samantha Scarlette played guitar on all of the tracks, except for "Fallen Star".

Track listing

References

2011 debut EPs
Samantha Scarlette albums